The England national rugby union team competed in the first international rugby match in 1871 against Scotland. Since then they have played in 746 matches.

The record for most Test points by an England player is held by Jonny Wilkinson, who scored 1179 points between 1998 and 2011. The record for the number of Test tries is held by Rory Underwood, who scored 49 tries in 85 matches between 1984 and 1996.

Currently active players at Test level are listed in bold; those available for national selection but not currently in the national team setup are listed in italics. This list includes only points and tries scored playing for England, and does not include those scored for the British and Irish Lions.

Team records

Greatest winning margin

Greatest losing margin

Individual career records

Most appearances

Most points

Most tries

Most matches as captain

Individual match records

Most points in a match

Most tries in a match

See also
 England rugby union try record progression
 List of leading rugby union test point scorers
 List of leading rugby union test try scorers
 List of rugby union test caps leaders

References 

England Internat
Top